The following article is a list of United States national rugby league team results from 1953.

1950s

1980s

1990s

2000s

2010s

Other Games 

 27 May 1953 – Canberra Division 25–34 USA – Mankua Oval, Canberra, 4,827
 30 May 1953 – Sydney XIII 52–25 USA – Sydney Cricket Ground, 65,453
 2 June 1953 – NSW 62–41 USA – Sydney Cricket Ground, 32,554
 7 June 1953 – Combined Country 35–9 USA – Wollongong Showgrounds, 11,787
 10 June 1953 – Western Division 24–21 USA – Dubbo Oval, 4,717
 13 June 1953 – Newcastle XIII 10–19 USA – Newcastle Sports Ground, 14,160
 17 June 1953 – North Coast 26–18 USA – Coffs Harbour, 5,400
 20 June 1953 – Queensland 39–36 USA – The Gabba, Brisbane, 24,397
 24 June 1953 – Far North Queensland 17–17 USA – Parramatta Park, Cairns, 6,042
 28 June 1953 – North Queensland 38–17 USA – SportsReserve, Townsville, 7,807
 1 July 1953 – Central West Queensland 26–21 USA – Longreach, 1,635
 5 July 1953 – Central Queensland Coast 33–26 USA – Murray Street Ground, Rockhampton, 5,332
 7 July 1953 – Brisbane XIII 39–26 USA – The Gabba, 7,000
 15 July 1953 – Toowoomba 29–15 USA – Athletic Oval, 5,778
 18 July 1953 – Ipswich 15–16 USA – North Ipswich Reserve, 3,155
 19 July 1953 – Wide Bay 33–33 USA – Maryborough Showgrounds, Brisbane, 6,166
 22 July 1953 – Riverina 30–14 USA – Anzac Park, Gundagai, 2,560
 25 July 1953 – NSW 27–18 USA – Sydney Cricket Ground, 19,686
 1 August 1953 – Auckland 54–26 USA – Carlaw Park, 12,377
 5 August 1953 – Taranaki 18–21 USA – Pukekura Park, New Plymouth, 1,971
 8 August 1953 – Wellington 8–17 USA – Wellington Basin,
 11 August 1953 – West Coast 27–10 USA – Wingham Park, Greymouth, 1,913
 15 August 1953 – Canterbury 39–8 USA – Addington Showgrounds, Christchurch, 4,273
 19 August 1953 – Northland 5–26 USA – Jubilee Park, Whangarei, 867
 24 August 1953 – South Auckland 19–22 USA – Rugby Park, Hamilton, 2,496
 20 December 1953 – Languedoc XIII 30–22 USA – Stade Albert Domec, Carcassonne, 5,000
 25 December 1953 – RC Albi 11–5 USA – Stade Maurice Rigaud, 5,800
 27 December 1953 – France u21 37–21 USA – Stade Jean-Laffon, Perpignan, 
 1 January 1954 – Selection de Provence 12–22 USA – Stade Saint Ruf, Avignon, 3,000
 9 September 2002 – Tartastan 30–24 USA – 
 26 October 2012 – Queensland Murri 72–18 USA –

See also 

 United States Rugby League
 United States national rugby league team
 Rugby league in the United States

References 

 No Helmets Required by Gavin Willacy (American tours 1953–54)

United States national rugby league team
Rugby league-related lists